Major-General Gronow Davis VC (16 May 1828 – 18 October 1891) was an English recipient of the Victoria Cross, the highest and most prestigious award for gallantry in the face of the enemy that can be awarded to British and Commonwealth forces.

Details
Davis was 27 years old, and a captain in the Royal Regiment of Artillery, British Army during the Crimean War when the following deed took place for which he was awarded the VC.

On 8 September 1855 at Sebastopol, Crimea, Captain Davis commanded the spiking party in the attack on the Redan with great coolness and gallantry. Afterwards he saved the life of a lieutenant of the 39th Regiment of Foot by jumping over the parapet of a sap and going some distance across the open, under murderous fire, to help carry the wounded man to cover. He also carried several other wounded soldiers to safety.

He later achieved the rank of major-general. His Victoria Cross is displayed at the Royal Artillery Museum, Woolwich, England.

References

Location of grave and VC medal (Avon)

1828 births
1891 deaths
Military personnel from Bristol
Royal Artillery officers
British Army personnel of the Crimean War
Crimean War recipients of the Victoria Cross
British recipients of the Victoria Cross
British Army major generals
Graduates of the Royal Military Academy, Woolwich
Recipients of the Order of the Medjidie
British Army recipients of the Victoria Cross
People from Clifton, Bristol